Sendurai block is a revenue block of Ariyalur district of the Indian state of Tamil Nadu. This revenue block consist of 30 panchayat villages.

Panchayat Villages 
They are,

References 

Revenue blocks of Ariyalur district